Paula (Paola) Rosa Wiesinger later Steger (27 February 1907 – 12 June 2001) was a pioneering Italian alpine skier and mountain climber who competed at one edition of Winter Olympics and three editions of the FIS Alpine World Ski Championships (1932, 1933, 1934, 1936).

Biography
Wiesinger was born in Bolzano. She won the 1932 women's Downhill world championship in Cortina d'Ampezzo, and competed in the 1936 Winter Olympics, finishing 16th in the alpine skiing combined event. She married Hans Steger.

In 1935 Wiesinger was invited to view the Trofeo Mezzalama, a competition that was only intended for male ski mountaineers. Due to an injury leave of Giusto Gervasutti, she took his military uniform, covered her face with sunglasses and his cap, and took part instead of him, but the cheat was discovered at a check point of the race. She died in Seiser Alm. A hotel and a statue in Siusi allo Sciliar are dedicated to Wiesinger.

Olympic Games results

World Championship results

National titles
Wiesinger won 15 national titles.

Italian Alpine Ski Championships
Downhill: 1931, 1933, 1934, 1935, 1936 (5)
Slalom: 1931, 1933, 1934, 1936 (4)
Combined: 1931, 1932, 1933, 1934, 1935, 1936 (6)

See also
 Italy national alpine ski at the World championships

References

External links
 
 Biography 
 Profile 
 Alpine skiing 1936 
 Bio for Hans and Paula Steger
 Paula Wiesinger Apartments & Suites

Sportspeople from Bolzano
Italian female alpine skiers
Olympic alpine skiers of Italy
Italian female ski mountaineers
Alpine skiers at the 1936 Winter Olympics
Female-to-male cross-dressers
1907 births
2001 deaths
Germanophone Italian people
20th-century Italian women
21st-century Italian women